"Happy holidays" is a spoken or written greeting commonly used in North America during or before the Christmas and holiday season.

Happy Holidays or Happy Holiday may also refer to:

Music

Albums and EPs
 Happy Holiday (Jo Stafford album), 1955
 Happy Holidays: I Love the Winter Weather, a 1999 compilation album by Jo Stafford
 Happy Holiday (EP), by Marcella Detroit, 2011
 Happy Holidays (Billy Idol album), 2006
 Happy Holidays (Magnus Carlsson album), 2014
 Happy Holidays from Drive-Thru Records, a compilation album, 2004

Songs
 "Happy Holiday" (song), a 1942 song written by Irving Berlin
 "Happy Holiday", a track on the 2006 album Happy Holidays by Billy Idol
 "Happy Holiday", a track on the 2008 album We Stand United by beFour

Other uses
 Happy Holidays (TV series), a British television mini-series
Happy Holiday, a 1954 musical version of the play The Ghost Train
"Chag sameach", a Jewish greeting meaning "Happy holiday"

See also 
 Holiday (disambiguation)
 Happy Hollidays, a 2009 Scottish TV sitcom
 "Happy Holidays, You Bastard", a song from the 2001 album Take Off Your Pants and Jacket by Blink-182
 #1HappyHoliday, a 2017 EP by DRAM
 Happy Holidays to You, a 1979 album by The Whispers